Atherininae is a subfamily of silversides from the family, Atherinidae, the Old World silversides.

Genera
The subfamily contains the following genera:

 Atherina Linnaeus, 1758
 Atherinason Whitley, 1934
 Atherinosoma Castelnau, 1872
 Kestratherina A. Pavlov, Ivantsoff, Last & Crowley, 1988
 Leptatherina Pavlov, Ivantsoff, Last & Crowley, 1988

References

 
Ray-finned fish subfamilies
Atherinidae